Wulipu is a town in the northwest corner of Shayang County, Jingmen, Hubei Province, China. The name 'Wulipu' means 'a relay station for post horses five Li away from the city'.

History 
In early 1928, elements from the Chinese Communist Party participated in a violent agrarian uprising that erupted in Wulipu's Jinjiahu.

In 2000, a cache of Chu (state) Warring States period funerary artifacts dating to 340-300 BC was unearthed in eastern Wulipu's Zuozhong village during the construction of the G55 Erenhot–Guangzhou Expressway, locally the Xiang(yang)-Jing(zhou) Highway.

In March 2001, Shayang County's Caochang Township was disestablished. The former township became part of western Wulipu.

Geography 
Wulipu lies to the north of Shilipu, and south of Tuanlinpu.

Administrative divisions 
As of 2016, Wulipu comprised 21 village-level divisions including two communities and nineteen villages which were further divided into 250 villager groups and 18 residential groups:

Two residential communities:
Wuli, Caochang (formerly )

Nineteen villages:
Zhaoji, Xuchang, Shiling, Bailing, Yandian, Yangji, Hexin, Zaodian, Jintai, Liuji, Xianling, Zuozhong, Chenchi, Lianghe, Lianhe, Baihu, Huolong, Anquan, Taochang

Economy 
The two major incomes of the town are agriculture and tourism. The government of Shayang is trying to develop a tourism business based on cole flower fields in the area and holds an annual event for those interested in the flowers.

Demographics 

In 2016, 433 births and 211 deaths were recorded in Wulipu. The birth rate was 8.9‰ and death rate was 4.3‰ resulting in a natural population increase of 4.6‰. In the results of a separate survey published by the Shayang County government, Wulipu's population had increased from 48,044 to 48,132 during a survey period. 424 children were born during the survey period resulting in a birth rate of 8.82‰. During the same period, 63 people died, resulting in death rate of 1.31‰. Of the births in the survey, 406 (95.75%) were in compliance with the family planning policy of China. 312 (73.58%) of the births were the firstborn in the family. (All of these births were in compliance with the family planning policy of China.) Among the firstborn children, 157 were female. 107 (25.24%) of the births were the second-born child in the family. 90 of these births were in compliance with the family planning policy of China. Among the second-born children, 47 were female. Five (1.18%) of the births surveyed were neither the firstborn nor second-born child in the family. Four of these births were in compliance with the family planning policy of China. Among the children born who were neither firstborn nor second-born, two were female.

Transportation
North-South:
China National Highway 207
G55 Erenhot–Guangzhou Expressway
Jiaozuo–Liuzhou railway
East-West:
X020 (County Highway 20)

Education
Wulipu Central Primary School, abbreviated "Wuxiao" is a prominent school in Wulipu.

See also
List of township-level divisions of Hubei

References 

Chu (state)
Township-level divisions of Hubei
Jingmen